Laforin, encoded by the EPM2A gene, is a phosphatase, with a  carbohydate-binding domain, which is mutated in patients with Lafora disease.  It contains a dual specificity phosphatase domain (DSP) and a carbohydrate binding module subtype 20 (CBM20).  Its physiological substrate has yet to be identified and the molecular mechanisms in which mutated laforin causes Lafora disease is unknown, though there has been progress made in the study by Ortolano et al. Laforin regulates autophagy via Mammalian target of rapamycin, which is impaired in Lafora disease.

References

External links 
  GeneReviews/NCBI/NIH/UW entry on Progressive Myoclonus Epilepsy, Lafora Type